Minaketan Das (7 September 1961 – 30 June 2017) was an Indian actor active in the cinema of Odisha.

Career
He starred in his entry to cinema of Odisha through Odia - language film Sindura Nuhein Khela Ghara in 2002.

Death
He died on 30 June 2017 of pancreatic cancer at his home in Balianta, Bhubaneswar, aged 56.

Filmography
He appears in supporting roles in Odia films.

Selected filmography
Jiye Jaha Kahu Mora Dho (2015)
My Love Story (2013)
Deewana Deewani (2013)
Idiot: I Do Ishq Only Tumse (2012)
Balunga Toka (2011)
Sindura Nuhein Khela Ghara (2002)

References

External links

1961 births
2017 deaths
Male actors in Odia cinema
Deaths from pancreatic cancer
Deaths from cancer in India
21st-century Indian male actors